Blyth's river frog  (Limnonectes blythii), also known as Blyth's frog, giant Asian river frog or (ambiguously) giant frog, is a species of frog in the family Dicroglossidae found from Myanmar through western Thailand and the Malay Peninsula (Malaysia, Singapore) to Sumatra and Borneo (Indonesia). Earlier records from Laos and Vietnam are considered misidentifications.

Description
Blyth's river frog is a large frog. The skin is smooth on the dorsum, with or without scattered tubercles or longitudinal skin folds. They are brownish, grey, or yellowish above and white or yellowish below. They may or may not have a vertebral stripe on their backs.

Habitat
These frogs inhabit streams with gravel and rocks in primary and secondary evergreen forest. Males build a nesting hollow in a sandy stream bed area, and the tadpoles develop in streams. They can also be found far away from streams.

Use and conservation
The major threat to this species is collection for food, both for local consumption and for trade. It is also locally impacted by habitat loss.

Gallery

References

External links
 Amphibian and Reptiles of Peninsular Malaysia - Limnonectes blythii 
 Malayan giant frog

Limnonectes
Frogs of Asia
Amphibians of Myanmar
Amphibians of Indonesia
Amphibians of Malaysia
Amphibians of Thailand
Amphibians of Borneo
Amphibians of Singapore
Near threatened animals
Near threatened biota of Asia
Amphibians described in 1920
Taxonomy articles created by Polbot